Tarn Taran, Taran Taran, or Tiran Taran (also known as Chak No. 45/GB) is a village in the Faisalabad District located along Gojra—Samundri road.

References

Villages in Faisalabad District